County Road 86 is a  highway in Troms og Finnmark county, Norway.  The eastern end of the road begins in the village of Andselv (in the Bardufoss area of Målselv Municipality).  It then heads west to the Gisund Bridge connecting the mainland of Norway to the large island of Senja.  The road then heads across the island of Senja to the village of Torsken on the western coast of Senja Municipality.  Part of the route is one of eighteen designated National Tourist Routes in Norway.

References

086
086
National Tourist Routes in Norway
Sørreisa
Senja
Målselv
Roads within the Arctic Circle